The Harvey Wallbanger is a mixed drink made with vodka, Galliano, and orange juice. It is a variant of the screwdriver, and was very popular in the United States in the 1970s.

History

The Harvey Wallbanger was created in 1969 as a marketing campaign by McKesson Imports Company, importer of Galliano, as a means of driving sales of Galliano. The campaign was headed by George Bednar, marketing director of McKesson, and a cartoon character was commissioned from graphic artist William J. "Bill" Young in Lima, New York, with the tagline that Bednar claimed to have penned: "Harvey Wallbanger is the name. And I can be made!". The Harvey Wallbanger character was a surfer, appearing in various ads during the campaign, and was mentioned in print as early as 1969, continuing into the 1970s.

The cocktail itself is credited to three-time world champion mixologist Donato "Duke" Antone, of Hartford, Connecticut, where he ran a bartending school, Bartending School of Mixology (established 1949) and worked as a cocktail consultant. It is unclear if Antone designed the drink for Galliano (to advertise the ingredient), or renamed an existing drink, as suggested by his grandson, who claimed the earlier version was called "Duke's Screwdriver". An implausible story of the origin is that it was invented in 1952 by Antone, and named after a surfer frequenting Antone's Blackwatch Bar on Sunset Strip in Los Angeles. This is implausible because at the time, Antone was running a bartending school in Hartford, and there is no evidence of any "Blackwatch Bar" in Los Angeles at the time, so it is presumably a fabrication; spirits writer Robert Simonson goes so far as to say that "no sane person ever believed that story."

Cocktail historian David Wondrich considers the Harvey Wallbanger the first successful consultant-created cocktail saying,

Antone is also credited with the Freddy Fudpucker, which swaps vodka for tequila, but this was not nearly as popular.

Other uses
 The 1982 Milwaukee Brewers, winners of the American League pennant, were nicknamed "Harvey's Wallbangers," because of the team's power hitting (wallbanging) under mid-season manager Harvey Kuenn. After a mediocre 23–24 start to the season, manager Buck Rodgers was fired. Under Kuenn, the team went 72–43 (.626), led the Major Leagues in home runs and total bases, and produced the highest team OPS+ since the  New York Yankees.
 Conservative talk-show host Michael Savage refers to rival conservative talk-show host Sean Hannity as Harvey Wallbanger.

See also

References

Cocktails with liqueur
Cocktails with vodka
Food and drink introduced in 1952
Three-ingredient cocktails
Cocktails with orange juice